Miraflores is a district of the Lima Province in Peru. It is a residential and upscale shopping district south of downtown Lima. It is also one of the most affluent districts that make up the city of Lima. It has several hotels (including the Hilton, the JW Marriott, and the Belmond), restaurants, bars, nightclubs, and department stores. Miraflores is one of the main tourist destinations in Lima.

Founded as San Miguel de Miraflores, it was established as a district on January 2, 1857. As a result of the Battle of Miraflores fought during the War of the Pacific, Miraflores got the designation of Ciudad Heroica ("Heroic City"). The district's postal code is 18.

Geography 

The district has a total land area of 9.62 km2. Its administrative center is located 79 meters above sea level.

Boundaries

 North: San Isidro and Surquillo
 East: Surquillo and Santiago de Surco
 South: Barranco and Santiago de Surco
 West: Pacific Ocean

Climate

Miraflores has a marine climate, characterized by mild, humid, and comfortable conditions. Low clouds are frequent, especially during winter, when morning drizzles are not uncommon. Heavy rain is almost unseen.

History 

The only pre-Inca ruin remaining in Miraflores, Huaca Pucllana (formerly Hispanicized as Juliana) can still be seen.
The Spanish town of Miraflores was established in the 16th century.  However it was merged into the Lima Metropolitan Area as the city expanded during the early 20th century.  During the War of the Pacific (1879–1885), the district was the scene of the Battle of Miraflores. Two thousand people died as a result and the district was sacked and burned by Chilean invaders.

In 1992, a street in the district was the location of a terrorist attack perpetrated by terror group Sendero Luminoso.

Demographics 

According to the 2017 national census done by the INEI, the district has 99,337 inhabitants and a population density of 10,326 persons per km2 (26,744 persons per sq mile). Miraflores has a high Human Development Index at 0,986 and the lowest population living below the poverty line in Lima at 1.80%. Along with its northern neighbour, San Isidro, Miraflores is inhabited primarily by upper-class residents and is consistently listed as one of the most expensive districts in the country.

Culture and education 

The district is also a cultural center, with theaters, cinemas and art galleries. It also has a pre-Inca mud-brick temple called the Huaca Pucllana, one of a number of archaeological sites found in Lima.

Private schools predominate in Miraflores, with the district housing 128 such institutions as of 2010. Conversely, the district is home to only 12 public schools; this can be attributed to the socioeconomic makeup of the district. Schools are divided into primary (grades 1–6) and secondary school (grades 1-5 or 7–11). Since in Peru school only takes 11 years, the typical university education is 5 years long (for undergraduates).

In terms of education, the Miraflores district lodges some of the most prestigious private schools in Peru, such as the British schools Markham College, and San Silvestre School, the German school Deutsche Schule Alexander von Humboldt, and the Swiss school Colegio Pestalozzi. It also lodges the University of Piura and the Raúl Porras Barrenechea Institute of the National University of San Marcos.

Economy 

Tourism dominates the economy of the district. LAN Perú has its headquarters in Miraflores. The former airline Aeroperú also had its headquarters in Miraflores.

Entertainment 

The district is full of hotels, cafés, pubs, restaurants and shops, which draw large crowds of the local population on Sundays. Parque Kennedy, Miraflores' central plaza, regularly has flea markets and art exhibitions. Larcomar, a shopping mall overlooking the Pacific coast, is located in Miraflores, and is very popular among tourists, young people, and the middle and upper classes. There are restaurants, stores, a food court, ice cream shops, arcades, bowling alleys, nightclubs, bars, and the most modern cinema in Lima.

The main tourist attractions include an archaeological complex called La Huaca Pucllana, Parque Kennedy, the Iglesia Virgen Milagrosa (church of the Miraculous Virgin), Parque del Amor (Lover's Park), the Larcomar mall, and Calle de las Pizzas (Pizza Street). 
The Calle de las Pizzas, located in downtown Miraflores, is a favourite among the youth, foreigners and locals alike. It is home to many pubs, and as its name implies, offers not only drinks but also varieties of pizzas and other food.

Miraflores has always been a major hub for tourists in Lima. There are a number of hotels in the area, including a couple of international hotel brands. Furthermore, there are several shops selling souvenirs and tourist products. The Miraflores Park Hotel is one of the district's five-star hotels.

Costa Verde 

The Costa Verde ("green coast") area has several beaches, which draw surfers and beachgoers during the summertime. However, these rocky beaches are not as popular with bathers as the large, sandy beaches in the districts south of Lima, such as Santa María del Mar, Punta Hermosa, San Bartolo, Lurín and Punta Negra. La Marina Lighthouse is located on the cliffs overlooking the Costa Verde.

Paragliders launch from the coastal cliffs, providing there is enough wind.

Skyline

Sister cities 

  Pensacola, FL, since 1964, through the efforts of Captain Harold Grow.
  Las Condes, CL

See also 

 List of mayors of Miraflores District
 List of upscale shopping districts

References

External links 

  Municipalidad de Miraflores - Miraflores District Council official website

Districts of Lima